My Roomie Is a Dino, also known as , is a Japanese manga series written by Moriko Mori and illustrated by Cota Tomimura. It was serialized in Kodansha's seinen manga magazine Weekly Young Magazine from October 2018 to January 2022. Its chapters has been collected in six tankōbon volumes as of September 2021.

An anime television series adaptation by Space Neko Company and Kamikaze Douga premiered on April 5, 2020. A live-action drama adaptation also premiered the same day and ran for three episodes.

Characters

 
Portrayed by: 8467 (live-action)

Media

Manga
My Roomie Is a Dino, written by Moriko Mori and illustrated by Cota Tomimura, was serialized in Kodansha's seinen manga magazine Weekly Young Magazine from October 15, 2018, to January 24, 2022. Kodansha has collected its individual chapters into six tankōbon volumes as of October 2021.

In March 2020, Kodansha USA announced the acquisition of the manga for an English-language digital release.

Volume list

TV drama
A live-action drama adaptation written by Kotaro Sudo premiered on April 5, 2020. Gravure idol Nana Yashiro (professionally known as “8467”) plays Kaede in this version.

Anime
On September 2, 2019, Kodansha revealed that an anime television series adaptation was announced. The series is co-animated by Space Neko Company and Kamikaze Douga, with Jun Aoki directing and writing the series' scripts, and Gin composing the series' music. It premiered on April 5, 2020 on Tokyo MX and BS11.

On May 12, 2020, it was announced that the airings of Episode 8 and onward were delayed due to the effects of the ongoing COVID-19 pandemic. On July 19, 2020, it was announced that both the anime and live-action series would resume in October 2020. The series was rebroadcast from the first episode on October 4, 2020, and resumed on November 22, 2020.

Funimation is streaming the anime in English-speaking countries under the title of Gal & Dino. An English dub of the anime was released on March 5, 2022.

Episode list
All episodes were written and directed by Jun Aoki.

Notes

References

External links
 
 

2020 Japanese television series debuts
Anime postponed due to the COVID-19 pandemic
Anime productions suspended due to the COVID-19 pandemic
Anime series based on manga
Comedy anime and manga
Dinosaurs in anime and manga
Funimation
Gyaru in fiction
Japanese television series with live action and animation
Kodansha franchises
Kodansha manga
Manga adapted into television series
Muse Communication
Seinen manga
Slice of life anime and manga